Haumole Olakau'atu (born 1 October 1998) is a Tonga international rugby league footballer who plays as a  forward for the Manly-Warringah Sea Eagles in the National Rugby League (NRL).

Background
Olakau'atu was born in Guildford, New South Wales, Australia, and is of Tongan descent.

Olakau'atu played junior rugby league with Berala Bears and Wentworthville Magpies. He later tried out for the Parramatta SG Ball and Harold Matthews sides but was unsuccessful.  Olakau'atu then was signed by Manly and played for the club in their 2017 Holden Cup premiership winning side against Parramatta.

Playing career

2019
Olakau'atu made his NRL debut for Manly against the Cronulla-Sutherland Sharks in week 1 of the finals of the 2019 NRL season.
Olakau'atu was kept in the Manly team for the following week against South Sydney in which Manly lost 34-26 in the elimination semi-final at ANZ Stadium.

2020
He made five appearances for Manly in the 2020 NRL season as the club missed out on the finals finishing 13th on the table.

2021
In round 14 of the 2021 NRL season, he scored two tries for Manly in a 50-18 victory over North Queensland.
He played 21 games for Manly in the 2021 NRL season including the club's preliminary final loss against South Sydney.

2022
Olakau'atu was one of seven players involved in the Manly pride jersey player boycott.
He made a total of 21 appearances for Manly in the 2022 NRL season scoring ten tries.  Manly would finish the season in 11th place and missed out on the finals.

2023
In round 3 of the 2023 NRL season, he scored two tries including the winner in Manly's 34-30 victory over Parramatta.

References

External links
Manly Sea Eagles profile

1998 births
Living people
Australian rugby league players
Australian sportspeople of Tongan descent
Manly Warringah Sea Eagles players
Rugby league second-rows
Rugby league players from Sydney
Tonga national rugby league team players